New Wine into Old Wineskins (οἶνον νέον εἰς ἀσκοὺς παλαιούς, lit.: New Wine into Old Bottles) is a parable of Jesus.

Passage
The parables follow the recruitment of Levi as a disciple of Jesus, and appear to be part of a discussion at a banquet held by him. The parables are told in response to a question about fasting:

Jesus' response continues with the two short parables. Luke has the more detailed version:

Interpretation
The two parables relate to the relationship between Jesus' teaching and traditional Judaism. According to some interpreters, Jesus here "pits his own, new way against the old way of the Pharisees and their scribes." In the early second century, Marcion, founder of Marcionism, used the passage to justify a "total separation between the religion that Jesus and Paul espoused and that of the Hebrew Scriptures."

Other Interpreters of the Torah observing community would state that this new skin represents a new body as we die to our old self, and then we see the new wine symbolises a new spirit, which is the spirit of God in us, the new wine into a new body, could also be seen as the resurrection into a new body then having a new spirit, but it seems to be more indicating to the baptism and the receiving of the Holy Spirit, a new you with a new spirit leading you after a godly life after his Torah in love.

Other interpreters see Luke as giving Christianity roots in Jewish antiquity, although "Jesus has brought something new, and the rituals and traditions of official Judaism cannot contain it."

In his commentary on Matthew, Mark, and Luke, John Calvin says this is part of the larger answer Christ is making to the Pharisees about the fact his disciples did not fast twice a week as they did, and as the disciples of John the Baptist did (Calvin also points out that the Pharisees were using it as a way to create a division between Jesus and John). In the first part of the answer, he illustrates through a marriage situation: it would be ridiculous to fast during the event which used to last a week in their culture, especially when you are with the groom. Christ (which means "messiah") is the groom, so there is no point for them to fast, only to rejoice. Calvin then states that both distinctions (old and new wine and wineskins as well as the old and new garment) are the mentality and oral tradition left by the Pharisees which is not in accord with the proper teachings of the law, as Jesus was preaching. So those who follow Jesus should abandon their old (and bad) views on how they must obey the law, and not the oral tradition with what Jesus was preaching. But especially the Pharisees had a taste for it, and it blocked their minds to recognize what Jesus was teaching them. 

Based on parallel rabbinic sayings found in Pirkei Avot, one interpreter sees the parable as depicting the difficulty of teaching disciples with prior learning as compared to teaching new, uneducated disciples.

The metaphors in the two parables were drawn from contemporary culture. New cloth had not yet shrunk, so that using new cloth to patch older clothing would result in a tear as it began to shrink. Similarly, old wineskins had been "stretched to the limit" or become brittle as wine had fermented inside them; using them again therefore risked bursting them.

Cornelius a Lapide in his great commentary gives the traditional interpretation of this parable, writing that: "Christ shows by a threefold similitude, that His disciples must not fast when He was present. 1. By the parable of the Spouse and the wedding. 2. Of the old and new garment. 3. Of the new wine, and the old bottles of skin. The sense is this: 'As new wine, or must, by the violence of its fermenting spirit, and its heat, bursts the old skins, because they are worn and weak, and so there is a double loss, both of wine and skins; therefore new wine must be poured into new skins, that, being strong, they may be able to bear the force of the must: so in like manner, new austerities and fasts must not be imposed as yet upon My disciples, lest their spirits should be broken, and they depart from Me. But I wait for the coming of the Holy Ghost at Pentecost.'"

See also
 Abrogation of Old Covenant laws
 Biblical law in Christianity
 The New Commandment
 New Covenant
 Split of early Christianity and Judaism
 Supersessionism
 Covenant (biblical)

References 

Christian terminology
Judaism in the New Testament
New Testament words and phrases
Parables of Jesus
Metaphors referring to food and drink
Judaism and other religions